Architecture-Studio is a French architecture practice created in 1973 in Paris. Around its 14 partners, Architecture-Studio brings together an international team of architects, urban planners, interior designers, quantity surveyors and sustainable design specialists of twenty five different nationalities.

The Seat of the European Parliament in Strasbourg, the Arab World Institute in Paris (together with Jean Nouvel), and the Notre-Dame-de-l'Arche-d'Alliance Church in Paris stand among Architecture-Studio's best known projects. Architecture-Studio has been developing over the years and has established an office in Shanghai, and CA'ASI in Venice, Italy.

Philosophy
Architecture-Studio defines architecture as "an art that is socially committed and engaged in the construction of mankind's living environment".  Architecture-Studio's work is based on group culture, developing a real team work through a collective conception of Architecture; a will to go beyond individual interests in favour of dialogue and debate, thereby transforming all individual knowledge into collective creative potential.

Architecture-Studio believes that this also involves being open to encounters that can alter the way of thinking or, at least, inflect it (a book, a film, a man, a mistake on a building site…).  This approach is a key to the conception process; a process which is not linear but iterative, not static but dynamic, not only intellectual and abstract but organic and concrete.

Associates
Carried by this open-minded attitude, Architecture-Studio's team has progressively grown. Martin Robain, the founder, has been joined by:

 Rodo Tisnado (since 1976);
 Jean-François Bonne (since 1979);
 René-Henri Arnaud (since 1989);
 Alain Bretagnolle (since 1989);
 Laurent-Marc Fisher (since 1993);
 Marc Lehmann (since 1998);
 Roueida Ayache (since 2001);
 Gaspard Joly (since 2009);
 Marica Piot (since 2009);
 Mariano Efron (since 2009);
 Amar Sabeh El Leil (since 2009);
 Romain Boursier (since 2018);
 Widson Monteiro (since 2018) .

Office and subsidiaries
 , Paris :
10 rue Lacuée, 12e Arrondissement (main office);
 , Shanghai :
Building 20# TongLeFang, No.555 HaiFang Road, Shanghai (subsidiary);
 , Venice :
Campiello Santa Maria Nova, Cannaregio (CA'ASI, exhibition space).

Main projects

 1987: Arab World Institute, Paris, together with Jean Nouvel,
 1987: Futuroscope's Lycée Pilote Innovant, near Poitiers, France,
 1990: University of the Citadelle, Dunkirk, France,
 1991: Lycée des Arènes, Toulouse, France,
 1994: Forum des Arènes, Toulouse, France,
 1994: École des mines Engineering school, Albi, France,
 1996: Courthouse, Caen, France,
 1998: Notre-Dame-de-l'Arche-d'Alliance Church, Paris, France,
 1999: Seat of the European Parliament in Strasbourg, France,
 2002: Danone Vitapole Research Center, Palaiseau, France,
 2003: Wison Group Headquarters in Shanghai, China,
 2005: Avicenne Hospital complex, Bobigny, France,
 2006: Fine-Arts School of Clermont-Ferrand, France,
 2007: Company Headquarters for French supermarket company Casino, Saint-Étienne, France,
 2011: Advancia Business School, Paris, France,
 2011: Onassis Foundation Cultural Center, Athens, Greece.
 2012: National Theatre of Bahrain, Manama, Bahrain.

External links
 Architecture-Studio, official website

Architecture firms of France
Design companies established in 1973